The World's Largest Entertainment McDonald's, also known as Epic McD, and formerly known as Mickey D's, is a McDonald's restaurant which opened in 1976 in Orlando, Florida. A branch of McDonald's located in Kaohsiung, Taiwan, is believed to be taller.

Menu
In addition to the standard McDonald's menu, the World's Largest Entertainment McDonald's offers over 50 additional items, including brick oven pizza, Belgian waffles, customized pasta dishes, omelettes, and additional items on the "Gourmet Bistro" menu, along with an expanded dessert menu like ice cream.

Restaurant
The World's Largest Entertainment McDonald's has three stories and offers a 22-foot-tall PlayPlace, over 100 arcade games, and a waving 30-foot-tall image of Ronald McDonald at the entrance. Initially opened in 1976, the restaurant was closed for renovation in 2015 and reopened as a rebuilt building in 2016. The restaurant is open 24 hours and features a "Create Your Own" menu.

References

McDonald's buildings and structures
Restaurants established in 1976
Restaurants in Florida